Floyd James "Jim" Thompson (July 8, 1933 – July 16, 2002) was a United States Army colonel. He was one of the longest-held American prisoners of war, spending nearly nine years in captivity in the forests and mountains of South Vietnam, Laos, and North Vietnam during the Vietnam War.

Early life
Jim Thompson was born July 8, 1933, in Bergenfield, New Jersey, as the son of a bus driver. He graduated from Bergenfield High School in 1951. Thompson worked for the A&P supermarket, before he was drafted by the United States Army on June 14, 1956. He was at first a very truculent, rebellious soldier, but then decided that he liked the military. After basic training at Fort Dix, New Jersey, he decided to make the military his career.

Military career
After completing Officer Candidate School, Thompson served stateside and also spent a year in Korea. He was stationed at Fort Bragg when he was recruited into the Army Special Forces as a Green Beret. After completing Ranger School and Jump School, he served as an instructor with the U.S. Army Infantry School at Fort Benning, Georgia, from August 1958 to June 1960. His next assignment was as a platoon commander in the 2nd Brigade of the 34th Infantry Regiment, stationed in South Korea from June 1960 to July 1961. Thompson then served as a reenlistment officer with Headquarters XVIII Airborne Corps at Fort Bragg, North Carolina, from September 1961 to September 1962, and then as a staff officer with 1st Special Forces at Fort Bragg, from September 1962 to December 1963.

Vietnam War
Captain Thompson went to Vietnam in December 1963. Prior to his deployment, he hadn't heard of the country. He was to serve only a six-month tour of duty but was captured on March 26, 1964. He was released on March 16, 1973, ten days short of nine years.

Capture
Thompson survived the crash with burns, a bullet wound across the cheek, and a broken back. Whitesides was killed in the crash. Thompson was quickly captured by the Viet Cong.

Aerial search and ground patrols failed to find any trace of the aircraft.  On March 27, 1964, an Army officer visited Thompson's home and told his pregnant wife Alyce that he was missing. The trauma sent her into labor and their son was born that evening.

Prisoner of war

Thompson spent the next nine years (3,278 days) as a prisoner of war, first at the hands of the Viet Cong in the South Vietnam forests, until he was moved in 1967 to the Hanoi prison system. During his captivity, he was tortured, starved, and isolated from other American POWs. His captors pressured him to sign statements proving that the United States' involvement in Vietnam was criminal. He refused and was beaten, choked and hanged by his thumbs. They also tied his elbows behind his back and hung him from a rafter until he passed out. At night he was tossed into a tiny wooden cage, where he was handcuffed and shackled in leg irons. At one point, Thompson did not speak to another American for over five years. In January 1973, Thompson was transferred to Hỏa Lò Prison. He was released with the other POWs in mid-March 1973 in Operation Homecoming.

Return to the United States
The years following Thompson's release were not happy ones. His troubled life was chronicled in an oral biography called Glory Denied by Tom Philpott. Although Thompson was promoted to lieutenant colonel upon release and then to full colonel, he had missed the most important years of his military career while in prison. He had no formal military education beyond OCS and lacked even a college degree or experience as a company commander.

He had difficulty adjusting to a vastly changed peacetime Army. In addition, Thompson's marriage had been troubled even before his captivity, and his wife Alyce, believing him dead, was living with another man at the time he was repatriated. He and his wife divorced in 1975. Alyce told author Tom Philpott that she believed prison had affected her husband's mind. She said he suffered from nightmares and was abusive towards both her and the children. Thompson later remarried but divorced soon afterwards. Thompson never formed any kind of a relationship with his children. His daughters were 6, 5 and 4 when he left, and his son was born the day of his capture. Only his eldest child barely remembered him. He eventually became completely estranged from all of them.
 
Thompson said that one of the things that helped him cope with his brutal imprisonment was thinking of the fine family that awaited his return. He developed a very serious drinking problem and was in several military hospitals for treatment.

In 1977, Thompson attempted suicide with an overdose of pills and alcohol. His superiors told author Philpott that had it not been for Thompson's status as a hero, he would have been dismissed from service because of his alcoholism. In 1981, while still on active duty, Thompson suffered a massive heart attack and a severe stroke. He was in a coma for months and was left seriously disabled. He was paralyzed on one side and could speak only in brief phrases for the rest of his life.

Retirement
The stroke that left Thompson's left side paralyzed and his age contributed to his forced retirement from active duty in the Army.  A ceremony was held for him in The Pentagon on January 28, 1982.  Thompson received the Distinguished Service Medal in appreciation for his 25 years of service to his country as an Army officer. Because of his recent stroke, he had a hard time speaking, so Michael Chamowitz, his close friend and lawyer, read his retirement speech.

Later years and death
In 1981, Thompson moved to Key West, where he remained active in the community, according to the Monroe County Office of Veterans Affairs. In 1988, Thompson and a number of other former prisoners of war were awarded medals by President Ronald Reagan.

In 1990, Thompson's son Jim was convicted of murder and imprisoned for sixteen years.

On July 8, 2002, the staff of JIATF (Joint Interagency Task Force) East and some of his close friends threw Thompson a birthday party. He was described as being in high spirits and full of excitement. During the celebration, he quoted General Douglas MacArthur: "Old soldiers never die, they just fade away."

Eight days later, on July 16, 2002, Thompson was found dead in his Key West By the Sea condominium, at the age of 69. His body was cremated, and his ashes scattered at sea off the coast of Florida. There is a memorial marker for him at Andersonville National Cemetery.

In an update to Glory Denied, Tom Philpott reported that Alyce Thompson died of cancer in 2009. He also mentioned that Thompson's daughter Ruth had suffered three disabling heart attacks and had lost a son to suicide. Philpott reported that Ruth had told him the strength of character that she inherited from both her parents had helped her though the difficult times. Glory Denied was later turned into an opera written by Tom Cipullo.

Military awards
In October 1974, Thompson started to receive medals and awards in recognition for his service in Vietnam. South Vietnam gave him the country's highest award to Allied enlisted military personnel for valor, the Republic of Vietnam Military Merit Medal.

In recognition of his escape from Viet Cong POW camp for two days in October 1971, Thompson received the Silver Star. For his nine years in captivity, Thompson received the Army Distinguished Service Medal, Bronze Star Medal, and Legion of Merit. The Bronze Star recognized his continuous resistance to the enemy. The Legion of Merit recognized his suffering for his nine years in captivity.

A ceremony was held on June 24, 1988, in the White House honoring POWs from World War I, World War II, Korea and Vietnam. Two representatives were picked from each war to receive the Prisoner of War Medal. Thompson and Everett Alvarez were chosen to represent POWs from Vietnam.

His military decorations and awards include:

See also
Prisoner of War Camps
Awards and decorations of the Vietnam War
Aircraft losses of the Vietnam War
U.S. prisoners of war during the Vietnam War
List of people pardoned or granted clemency by the president of the United States

References

External links
Glory Denied: The Saga of Jim Thompson, America's Longest-Held Prisoner of War
F. J. Thompson, 69, Longtime P.O.W., Dies, Published: July 18, 2002 in The New York Times

POW Network
POW/MIA Freedom Fighters
Booknotes interview with Tom Philpott on Glory Denied: The Saga of Jim Thompson, America's Longest-Held Prisoner of War, August 5, 2001.

1933 births
2002 deaths
People from Bergenfield, New Jersey
People from Key West, Florida
United States Army personnel of the Vietnam War
United States Army colonels
Vietnam War prisoners of war
Recipients of the Silver Star
Recipients of the Legion of Merit
American torture victims
Recipients of the Distinguished Service Medal (US Army)
The Great Atlantic & Pacific Tea Company
Bergenfield High School alumni
Recipients of the Air Medal
Recipients of the Gallantry Cross (Vietnam)
Burials at sea